John and Benjamin Green were a father and son who worked in partnership as architects in North East England during the early nineteenth century. John, the father was a civil engineer as well as an architect. Although they did carry out some commissions separately, they were given joint credit for many of their projects, and it is difficult to attribute much of their work to a single individual. In general, John Green worked on civil engineering projects, such as road and rail bridges, whereas Benjamin worked on projects that were more purely architectural. Their work was predominantly church and railway architecture, with a sprinkling of public buildings that includes their masterpiece, Newcastle's Theatre Royal.

Drawings by John and Benjamin Green are held by the Laing Art Gallery in Newcastle upon Tyne.

Biographies

John Green

John Green was born on 29 June 1787 at Newton Fell House, Nafferton, two miles north of Ovington, Northumberland. He was the son of Benjamin Green, a carpenter and maker of agricultural implements. After finishing school, he worked in his father's business. The firm moved to the market town of Corbridge and began general building work with young John concentrating on architectural work. About 1820, John set up business as an architect and civil engineer in nearby Newcastle upon Tyne.

John Green married Jane Stobart in 1805, and they had two sons, John (c.1807–68) and Benjamin (c1811-58), both of whom became architects. Little is known about the career of John, but Benjamin worked in partnership with his father on many projects.

In 1822 John Green designed a new building for the Newcastle Literary and Philosophical Society. The building, which houses the society's substantial library, is still in use today. He also designed a number of farmhouses, being employed on the Beaufront estate near Hexham and also on the Duke of Northumberland’s estates.

John Green was principally a civil engineer, and built several road and rail bridges. In 1829–31 he built two wrought-iron suspension bridges crossing the Tyne (at Scotswood) and the Tees (at Whorlton). The bridge at Scotswood was demolished in 1967 but the one at Whorlton still survives. When the High Level Bridge at Newcastle was proposed ten years later, John Green submitted plans, but those of Robert Stephenson were accepted by the York, Newcastle and Berwick Railway. Green also built a number of bridges using an innovative system of laminated timber arches on masonry piers, the Weibeking system, based on the work of Bavarian engineer C.F. Weibeking. The two he built for the Newcastle and North Shields Railway, at the Ouseburn and at Willington Quay remain in use, though the timbers were replaced with wrought iron in a similar lattice pattern in 1869. In 1840 he was elected to the Institution of Civil Engineers, and in 1841 he was awarded the institution's Telford Medal for his work on laminated arch design.

John Green died in Newcastle on 30 September 1852.

Benjamin Green

Benjamin Green was a pupil of Augustus Charles Pugin, father of the more famous Augustus Welby Northmore Pugin. In the mid-1830s he became a partner of his father and remained so until the latter's death in 1852. The two partners differed somewhat. John has been described as a 'plain, practical, shrewd man of business' with a 'plain, severe and economical' style, whereas Benjamin was 'an artistic, dashing sort of fellow', with a style that was 'ornamental, florid and costly'.

The Greens worked as railway architects and it is believed that all the main line stations between Newcastle and Berwick upon Tweed were designed by Benjamin. In 2020 Morpeth Station was restored to Green's original designs following a £2.3M investment. They also designed a number of Northumbrian churches, the best examples being at Earsdon and Cambo.

The Green's most important commissions in Newcastle were the Theatre Royal (1836–37) and the column for Grey's Monument (1837–38). Both of these structures were part of the re-development of Newcastle city centre in neo-classical style by Richard Grainger, and both exist today. Although both of the partners were credited with their design, it is believed that Benjamin was the person responsible.

Another well-known structure designed by the Greens is Penshaw Monument (1844). This is a folly standing on Penshaw Hill in County Durham. It was built as a half-sized replica of the renowned Temple of Hephaestus in Athens, and was dedicated to John George Lambton, first Earl of Durham and the first Governor of the Province of Canada. The monument, being built on a hill is visible for miles around and is a famous local landmark. It is now owned by the National Trust.

Benjamin Green survived his father by only six years, and died in a mental home at Dinsdale Park, County Durham on 14 November 1858.

Major works

Presbyterian Chapel, Newcastle upon Tyne, 1822 (demolished 2011)
Literary and Philosophical Society, Newcastle upon Tyne, 1822–1825
St Peter's Church, Falstone, 1824-5
Westgate Hill Cemetery, Newcastle upon Tyne, 1825–1829, (lodge demolished 1970, railings and gates removed, piers and basic layout remains)
Ingram Farm, Ingram, 1826
Whorlton Suspension Bridge, Wycliffe, County Durham, 1829–1831
Hawks Cottages, Gateshead, 1830 (demolished 1960)
Scotswood Chain Bridge, Newcastle upon Tyne, 1831, (demolished 1967)
Church of St Mary and St Thomas Aquinas, Blaydon, 1831–1832
Bellingham Bridge, Bellingham, 1834
Holy Trinity Church, Stockton-On-Tees, 1834-1835.
Holy Trinity Church, Dalton (near Stamfordham), 1836
Vicarage of St Alban, Earsdon, 1836
Church of St Alban, Earsdon, 1836–1837
St Mary's Roman Catholic Church, Alnwick, 1836
Church of the Holy Saviour, Newburn, 1836–1837
Poor Law Guardians Hall, North Shields, 1837
Master Mariners Homes, Tynemouth, 1837–1840
Theatre Royal, Newcastle upon Tyne, 1837
Parish Hall of the Church of the Holy Saviour, Newburn, 1838
Column of Grey's Monument, Newcastle upon Tyne, 1838
Willington Viaduct, Wallsend, 1837–1839
Ouseburn Viaduct, Newcastle upon Tyne, 1837–1839
Church of the Holy Saviour, Tynemouth, 1839–1841
Ilderton Vicarage, Ilderton, 1841
The Red Cottage, Whitburn, 1842
Holy Trinity Church, Cambo, 1842
Holy Trinity Church, Horsley-on-Rede, 1844
The Earl of Durham's Monument, Sunderland, 1844
St Edwin's, Coniscliffe, Co. Durham, 1844 (restoration of mediaeval church)
40-44 Moseley Street, Newcastle upon Tyne, 1845
Witham Testimonial Hall, Barnard Castle, 1846
Old Railway Station, Tynemouth Rd, Tynemouth 1846-7
Acklington Station, Acklington, 1847
Chathill Station, Chathill, 1847
Belford Station, Belford, Northumberland, 1847
Morpeth Station, Morpeth, Northumberland, 1847
Warkworth Station, Warkworth, Northumberland, 1847
Holy Trinity Church, Seghill, 1849
Newcastle Joint Stock Bank, St Nicholas Square, Newcastle, c.1850
Norham station, Norham, 1851
St Paul's Church, Elswick, 1854
All Saints Cemetery, Jesmond, 1854
Sailor's Home, 11 New Quay, North Shields, 1856
United Free Methodist Church, North Shields, 1857
Corn Exchange, Groat Market, Newcastle (demolished 1974)

Sources

 Grundy, J., McCombie, G., Ryder, P., Welfare, H. & Pevsner, N. (1992) The Buildings of England: Northumberland.

References

Literature

Architects from Northumberland
Business families
Business duos